Randy Allan Hanson (born January 17, 1968) is an American football coach who served as an assistant with the Minnesota Vikings, St. Louis Rams, and Oakland Raiders of the National Football League (NFL). Hanson was put on a paid leave-of-absence in August 2009 following an alleged incident with Head Coach Tom Cable where Hanson suffered a broken jaw.

Playing career 
Hanson played quarterback at Stockton Delta Junior College in 1987, Walla Walla Community College from 1988–89, and Pacific University (Forest Grove, Ore.) from 1990-91.

Coaching career

College 
Hanson began his coaching career as the Assistant Defensive Backs coach at Eastern Washington University (1993–1995). He then became a Graduate Assistant coach on Defense at the University of Washington (1996–1997) before returning to EWU as Secondary coach (1998–1999). From (2000–02) he was the Secondary coach at Portland State and added the role of Special Teams Coordinator. (2001–2002)

NFL 
In 2003, Hanson was hired by Mike Tice as an Offensive Quality Control coach for the Minnesota Vikings. In 2005, Hanson was promoted by the Minnesota Vikings to Assistant Quarterbacks coach. In 2006, Hanson was hired by Scott Linehan as an Offensive Quality Control coach for the St. Louis Rams. In 2007, Hanson joined the Oakland Raiders where he served under Defensive Coordinator Rob Ryan as Assistant Secondary Coach. In January 2009 the Oakland Raiders demoted Hanson to Assistant Coach-Defense. On August 5, 2009, Hanson and Raiders head coach Tom Cable were involved in an altercation that resulted in the breaking of Hanson's jaw. Hanson was placed on paid administrative leave. On October 22, 2009, the Napa District Attorney announced that no charges would be filed against Cable, as Hanson's story was not consistent with the other three assistant coaches who were in the room with Hanson and Cable. Hanson was reassigned to the team's scouting department in December 2009.

Later career
In 2011 he was an assistant under Dennis Green with the Sacramento Mountain Lions of the United Football League. In 2012 he returned to college football as the defensive backs coach of the Cal Poly Mustangs. On August 5, 2012 he was arrested on suspicion of assault with a deadly weapon for striking a person with a beer bottle. The following day the school suspended him indefinitely. He was convicted of felony battery and misdemeanor assault.

References 

1968 births
Living people
American people convicted of assault
Cal Poly Mustangs football coaches
Eastern Washington Eagles football coaches
Portland State Vikings football coaches
Washington Huskies football coaches
Minnesota Vikings coaches
Oakland Raiders coaches
St. Louis Rams coaches
Sacramento Mountain Lions coaches
Pacific Boxers football players
Walla Walla Warriors football players